Hitler is a 1996 Indian Malayalam-language comedy drama film written and directed by Siddique, produced by Ousepachan Valakuzhy and Lal under the banner of Ousepachan Movie House. It stars Mammootty in the title role with Mukesh, Shobana, Sai Kumar, Jagadish, and Vani Viswanath in supporting roles. The story centres around the life of Madhavankutty, locally known as 'Hitler' due to his tough character, domineering personality and his uncontrolled rage at the youngsters of the area, for stalking his five young sisters. The film features original songs composed by S. P. Venkatesh. Hitler became the highest-grossing Malayalam film of the year 1996, and completed more than 300 days theatrical run. The film broke the collection record of Mammootty-starrer The King that was released the previous year.

Plot 
The movie speaks about the life of Madhavankutty, a rich man locally known as "Hitler" due to his tough character, domineering personality and his uncontrolled rage at the youngsters of the area for stalking his five young sisters. Even though he loves his family more than anything in this world, he fails to express his love. He had been looking after the family since the death of their mother. Their father Pillechan is married again with two daughters and his children from the first marriage do not even speak with him (Madhavankutty's maternal uncle Gangadhara Menon is responsible for the separation between the children and Pillechan, which is revealed in a later part of the story). Madhavankutty's marriage was fixed with Gangadhara Menon's daughter Gauri and his sister Ammu’s marriage with Gauri's brother Balachandran. Once in Madhavankutty's absence, Balachandran sneaked in to his house to be with Ammu, but get caught which results in hostility between the two families and Madhavankutty opposes any of the decided marriages to happen between the families. Balachandran on the other hand wants to make them happen.

Things change when the eldest sister Seetha goes through an unfortunate event, where her unmarried professor under the influence of alcohol, rapes her. Coming back to senses, the professor confesses his act to Madhavankutty. Devastated on hearing this and learning how this incident can affect the lives of his younger sisters, he is forced to go with the solution that the professor puts forward. He gets Seetha married to the professor. His sister Ammu unaware of the facts behind the marriage gets furious with him, while he, being inherently stoic, behaved as a rude dominant to hide the facts. Balachandran finds this as an opportunity to get Ammu, who otherwise wouldn’t do anything against her brother’s wishes. Balachandran and Ammu get married and settle in the neighbourhood.

Due to the new developments, Madhavankutty's uncle Gangadhara Menon tries to befriend their rival family – Kompara. They on the other hand were waiting for an opportunity to take revenge, pretend to offer help, while their real intention was to increase the hatred between Madhavankutty and his uncle as they see Madhavankutty as a threat and can never do anything unless they remain enemies. They also suggest a marriage alliance with Gauri, which Gangadhara Menon approves. Gauri, still in love with Madhavankutty, acts pregnant saying Madhavankutty as the one responsible for it to prevent the marriage. This agitates Gangadhara Menon and under the advice of Nandakumar (from Kompara family), he decides to destroy the lives of Madhavankutty’s sisters, the way he destroyed Gauri's life. Madhavankutty's father learns about the plot and foils them, but it causes the girls and him to end up in the police station. He fails to convince his son about the truth and they become angrier at their father for his behaviour. Nandakumar sees the opportunity and they murder Pillechan. Madhavankutty, even though angry at his father’s deeds, does not desert his half sisters and brings them home, much to the dismay of his sisters who have an argument with him and leaves to Ammu's home to stay. Balachandran realises the seriousness of the situation and asks the girls to go back to their brother. He also say that whatever he did, was for Madhavankutty to stop sacrificing his life for his sisters and to get him married to his sister who loves him for life. Balachandran goes to find Madhavankutty to apologise, but gets attacked by a gang of thugs under the command of a person, seemingly Madhavankutty, while it actually was Krishnanunni the eldest of Kompara family who framed him. Balachandran survives and thinks Madhavankutty did it, which causes everyone, even Gauri to turn against him. Gangadhara Menon along with the ones from Kompara family goes to finish Madhavankutty once and for all, but learns that he himself was the target and Balachandran was not attacked by Madhavankutty. They try to murder Menon thinking after all that has happened Madhavankutty will not dare rescue him, but to their surprise he shows up to save Menon. Wounded Menon at the hospital tells to the rest of the family about his nephew's innocence. Madhavankutty survives the attack and succeeds in getting rid of the Kompara family from their lives. Losing hope at everything he believes, he decides to leave all behind and go someplace. He does not listen to the apologies or requests of the sisters to stay. He asks Balachandran to take care of the sisters and to find a better person for Gauri as he will never be a good husband for her. He begins to leave while a youngster shows up staring at his sisters leading him to chase the one, indicating that he can't stop being himself and can never leave.

Cast

 Mammootty as Mamangalath Madhavankutty / 'Hitler' Madhavankutty
 Mukesh as Balachandran (Madhavankutty's cousin)
 Shobhana as Gauri, Madhavankutty’s Fiancé & Balachandran’s Sister
 Jagadish as Hrudayabhanu (Balachandran's Friend)
 Innocent as Pillai, Madhavankutty's Father
 Saikumar as Nandakumar
 Vani Viswanath as Ammu Balachandran, Madhavankutty's Second Sister & Balachandran's Wife
 Ilavarasi as Seethalakshmi, Madhavankutty's First Sister
 Suchitra Murali as Gayathri, Madhavankutty's Third sister
 Chippy as Thulasi, Madhavankutty's Fourth Sister
 Seetha as Ambili, Madhavankutty's Fifth Sister
 Seena Antony as Sandhya, Madhavankutty's Half Sister
 Manju Thomas as Sindhu, Madhavankutty's Half Sister
 M.G. Soman as College Professor (Seetha’s husband) 
 Idavela Babu as Chandru
 Kozhikode Narayanan Nair as Gangadhara Menon, Balachandran's and Gouri's father
 Zainuddin as Sathyapalan - caretaker of Madhavankutty’s house
 Cochin Haneefa as Jabbar
 Kalabhavan Rahman as Sulaiman
 V. K. Sreeraman as Krishnan Unni
 Mohan Raj as Devarajan
 K. P. A. C. Lalitha as Balachandran's and Gouri's mother
 Adoor Bhavani as Sathyapalan's mother
 Kanakalatha as Nandakumar’s sister in law 
 Zeenath as Chandru’s mother 
 T. P. Radhamani
 Usharani as Dance teacher, Malathi
 Vineeth as Youngster (Cameo)

Release
The film was released on 14 April 1996.

Box office
The film was a commercial success. The film was the highest grossing Malayalam film at that time. The film ran 300 days in theatres. It is the most viewed film in the history of Mollywood.

Soundtrack

Remakes
The film was remade in Telugu under the same name in 1997, in Hindi as Krodh (2000), in Tamil as Military (2003), in Kannada as Varsha (2005) and in Bengali as Dadar Adesh (2005).

References

External links 
 

1990s Malayalam-language films
1996 comedy-drama films
1996 films
Films about families
Films directed by Siddique
Films shot in Palakkad
Films shot in Pollachi
Indian comedy-drama films
Malayalam films remade in other languages